The hypothalamic–pituitary–gonadal axis (HPG axis, also known as the hypothalamic–pituitary–ovarian/testicular axis) refers to the hypothalamus, pituitary gland, and gonadal glands as if these individual endocrine glands were a single entity. Because these glands often act in concert, physiologists and endocrinologists find it convenient and descriptive to speak of them as a single system.

The HPG axis plays a critical part in the development and regulation of a number of the body's systems, such as the reproductive and immune systems. Fluctuations in this axis cause changes in the hormones produced by each gland and have various local and systemic effects on the body.

The axis controls development, reproduction, and aging in animals. Gonadotropin-releasing hormone (GnRH) is secreted from the hypothalamus by GnRH-expressing neurons. The anterior portion of the pituitary gland produces luteinizing hormone (LH) and follicle-stimulating hormone (FSH), and the gonads produce estrogen and testosterone.

In oviparous organisms (e.g. fish, reptiles, amphibians, birds), the HPG axis is commonly referred to as the hypothalamus-pituitary-gonadal-liver axis (HPGL-axis) in females. Many egg-yolk and chorionic proteins are synthesized heterologously in the liver, which are necessary for ovocyte growth and development. Examples of such necessary liver proteins are vitellogenin and choriogenin.

The HPA, HPG, and HPT axes are three pathways in which the hypothalamus and pituitary direct neuroendocrine function.

Location and regulation 

The hypothalamus is located in the brain and secretes GnRH. GnRH travels down the anterior portion of the pituitary via the hypophyseal portal system and binds to receptors on the secretory cells of the adenohypophysis. In response to GnRH stimulation these cells produce LH and FSH, which travel into the blood stream.

These two hormones play an important role in communicating to the gonads. In females FSH and LH act primarily to activate the ovaries to produce estrogen and inhibin and to regulate the menstrual cycle and ovarian cycle. Estrogen forms a negative feedback loop by inhibiting the production of GnRH in the hypothalamus. Inhibin acts to inhibit activin, which is a peripherally produced hormone that positively stimulates GnRH-producing cells. Follistatin, which is also produced in all body tissue, inhibits activin and gives the rest of the body more control over the axis. In males LH stimulates the interstitial cells located in the testes to produce testosterone, and FSH plays a role in spermatogenesis. Only small amounts of estrogen are secreted in males. Recent research has shown that a neurosteroid axis exists, which helps the cortex to regulate the hypothalamus's production of GnRH.

In addition, leptin and insulin have stimulatory effects and ghrelin has inhibitory effects on gonadotropin-releasing hormone (GnRH) secretion from the hypothalamus. Kisspeptin also influences GnRH secretion.

Function

Reproduction 

One of the most important functions of the HPG axis is to regulate reproduction by controlling the uterine and ovarian cycles. In females, the positive feedback loop between estrogen and luteinizing hormone help to prepare the follicle in the ovary and the uterus for ovulation and implantation. When the egg is released, the empty follicle sac begins to produce progesterone to inhibit the hypothalamus and the anterior pituitary thus stopping the estrogen-LH positive feedback loop. If conception occurs, the placenta will take over the secretion of progesterone; therefore the mother cannot ovulate again. If conception does not occur, decreasing excretion of progesterone will allow the hypothalamus to restart secretion of GnRH. These hormone levels also control the uterine (menstrual) cycle causing the proliferation phase in preparation for ovulation, the secretory phase after ovulation, and menstruation when conception does not occur. The activation of the HPG axis in both males and females during puberty also causes individuals to acquire secondary sex characteristics.

In males, the production of GnRH, LH, and FSH are similar, but the effects of these hormones are different. FSH stimulates sustentacular cells to release androgen-binding protein, which promotes testosterone binding. LH binds to the interstitial cells, causing them to secrete testosterone. Testosterone is required for normal spermatogenesis and inhibits the hypothalamus. Inhibin is produced by the spermatogenic cells, which, also through inactivating activin, inhibits the hypothalamus. After puberty these hormones levels remain relatively constant.

Life cycle 

The activation and deactivation of the HPG axis also helps to regulate life cycles. At birth FSH and LH levels are elevated, and females also have a lifetime supply of primary oocytes. These levels decrease and remain low through childhood. During puberty the HPG axis is activated by the secretions of estrogen from the ovaries or testosterone from the testes. This activation of estrogen and testosterone causes physiological and psychological changes. Once activated, the HPG axis continues to function in men for the rest of their life but becomes deregulated in women, leading to menopause. This deregulation is caused mainly by the lack of oocytes that normally produce estrogen to create the positive feedback loop. Over several years, the activity the HPG axis decreases and women are no longer fertile.

Although males remain fertile until death, the activity of the HPG axis decreases. As males age, the testes begin to produce less testosterone, leading to a condition known as post-pubertal hypogonadism. The cause of the decreased testosterone is unclear and a current topic of research. Post-pubertal hypogonadism results in progressive muscle mass decrease, increase in visceral fat mass, loss of libido, impotence, decreased attention, increased risk of fractures, and abnormal sperm production.

Sexual dimorphism and behavior 

Sex steroids also affect behavior, because sex steroids affect the brains structure and functioning. During development, hormones help determine how neurons synapse and migrate to result in sexual dimorphisms. These physical differences lead to differences in behavior. While GnRH has not been shown to have any direct influence on regulating brain structure and function, gonadotropins, sex steroids, and activin have been shown to have such effects. It is thought that FSH may have an important role in brain development and differentiation.

Testosterone levels have been shown to relate to prosocial behavior. This helps create synaptogenesis by promoting neurite development and migration. Activin promotes neural plasticity throughout the lifespan and regulates the neurotransmitters of peripheral neurons. Environment can also affect hormones and behavior interaction.

Clinical relevance

Disorders
Disorders of the hypothalamic–pituitary–gonadal axis are classified by the World Health Organization (WHO) as:
 WHO group I of ovulation disorders: Hypothalamic–pituitary failure
 WHO group II of ovulation disorders: Hypothalamic–pituitary dysfunction. WHO group II is the most common cause of ovulation disorders, and the most common causative member is polycystic ovary syndrome (PCOS).

Gene mutations 

Genetic mutations and chromosomal abnormalities are two sources of HPG axis alteration. Single mutations usually lead to changes in binding ability of the hormone and receptor leading to inactivation or over activation. These mutations can occur in the genes coding for GnRH, LH, and FSH or their receptors. Depending on which hormone and receptor are unable to bind different effects occur but all alter the HPG axis.

For example, the male mutation of the GnRH coding gene could result in hypogonadotrophic hypogonadism. A mutation that cause a gain of function for LH receptor can result in a condition known as testotoxicosis, which cause puberty to occur between ages 2–3 years. Loss of function of LH receptors can cause male pseudohermaphroditism. In females mutations would have analogous effects. Hormone replacement can be used to initiate puberty and continue if the gene mutation occurs in the gene coding for the hormone. Chromosomal mutations tend to affect the androgen production rather than the HPG axis.

Suppression 
The HPG axis can be suppressed by hormonal birth control administration. Although often described as preventing pregnancy by mimicking the pregnancy state, hormonal birth control is effective because it works on the HPG axis to mimic the luteal phase of a woman's cycle. The primary active ingredients are synthetic progestins, which mimic biologically derived progesterone. The synthetic progestin prevents the hypothalamus from releasing GnRH and the pituitary from releasing LH and FSH; therefore it prevents the ovarian cycle from entering the menstrual phase and prevents follicle development and ovulation. Also as a result, many of the side effects are similar to the symptoms of pregnancy. Alzheimer's has been shown to have a hormonal component, which could possibly be used as a method to prevent the disease. Male contraceptives utilizing sex hormones approach the problem in a similar way.

The HPG axis can also be suppressed by GnRH antagonists or continuous administration of GnRH agonist, such as in the following applications
 Ovarian suppression as breast cancer management, to prevent the body's formation of estrogen which may stimulate breast cancer cells. This is generally done by continuous administration of GnRH agonist.
 Ovulation suppression as part of controlled ovarian hyperstimulation in in vitro fertilization, in order to prevent the spontaneous ovulation of ovarian follicles before they can be harvested.

Stimulation
Ovulation induction is usually initially performed by giving an antiestrogen such as clomifene citrate or letrozole in order to decrease negative feedback on the pituitary gland, resulting in an increase in FSH with the aim of increasing folliculogenesis. It is the main initial medical treatment for anovulation.

Environment factors 

Environment can have large impact on the HPG axis. For example, women with eating disorders tend to have oligomenorrhea and secondary amenorrhea. Starvation from anorexia nervosa or bulimia causes the HPG axis to deactivate causing women's ovarian and uterine cycles to stop. Stress, physical exercise, and weight loss have been correlated with oligomenorrhea and secondary amenorrhea. Similarly environmental factors can also affect men such as stress causing impotence. Prenatal exposure to alcohol can affect the hormones regulating fetal development resulting in foetal alcohol spectrum disorder.

Comparative anatomy 

The HPG axis is highly conserved in the animal kingdom. While reproductive patterns may vary, the physical components and control mechanisms remain the same. The same hormones are used with some minor evolutionary modifications. Much of the research is done on animal models, because they mimic so well the control mechanism of humans. It is important to remember humans are the only species to hide their fertile period, but this effect is a difference in the effect of the hormones rather than a difference in the HPG axis.

See also 

 Hypothalamic–pituitary–adrenal axis
 Hypothalamic–pituitary–thyroid axis
 Hypothalamic–neurohypophyseal system
 Neuroendocrinology
 Reproductive endocrinology

References 

Neuroendocrinology
Menstrual cycle
Gonadotropin-releasing hormone and gonadotropins
Human female endocrine system